

Peerage of England

|Duke of Cornwall (1337)||Prince James Francis Edward||1688||1702||
|-
|Duke of Norfolk (1483)||Henry Howard, 7th Duke of Norfolk||1684||1701||
|-
|Duke of Somerset (1547)||Charles Seymour, 6th Duke of Somerset||1678||1748||
|-
|Duke of Newcastle-upon-Tyne (1665)||Henry Cavendish, 2nd Duke of Newcastle-upon-Tyne||1676||1691||Died
|-
|Duke of Cleveland (1670)||Barbara Palmer, 1st Duchess of Cleveland||1670||1709||
|-
|Duke of Portsmouth (1673)||Louise de Kérouaille, Duchess of Portsmouth||1673||1734||
|-
|Duke of Richmond (1675)||Charles Lennox, 1st Duke of Richmond||1675||1723||
|-
|Duke of Southampton (1675)||Charles Fitzroy, 1st Duke of Southampton||1675||1730||
|-
|rowspan="2"|Duke of Grafton (1675)||Henry FitzRoy, 1st Duke of Grafton||1675||1690||Died
|-
|Charles FitzRoy, 2nd Duke of Grafton||1690||1757||
|-
|Duke of Ormonde (1682)||James Butler, 1st Duke of Ormonde||1682||1715||
|-
|Duke of Beaufort (1682)||Henry Somerset, 1st Duke of Beaufort||1682||1700||
|-
|Duke of Northumberland (1683)||George FitzRoy, 1st Duke of Northumberland||1683||1716||
|-
|Duke of St Albans (1684)||Charles Beauclerk, 1st Duke of St Albans||1684||1726||
|-
|Duke of Berwick (1687)||James FitzJames, 1st Duke of Berwick||1687||1695||Attainted, and his honours were forfeited
|-
|Duke of Cumberland (1689)||Prince George, Duke of Cumberland||1689||1708||
|-
|rowspan="2"|Duke of Bolton (1689)||Charles Paulet, 1st Duke of Bolton||1689||1699||Died
|-
|Charles Paulet, 2nd Duke of Bolton||1699||1722||
|-
|rowspan="3"|Duke of Schomberg (1689)||Frederick Schomberg, 1st Duke of Schomberg||1689||1690||Died
|-
|Charles Schomberg, 2nd Duke of Schomberg||1690||1693||Died
|-
|Meinhardt Schomberg, 3rd Duke of Schomberg||1693||1719||
|-
|Duke of Shrewsbury (1694)||Charles Talbot, 1st Duke of Shrewsbury||1694||1718||New creation
|-
|Duke of Leeds (1694)||Thomas Osborne, 1st Duke of Leeds||1694||1712||New creation for the 1st Marquess of Carmarthen
|-
|Duke of Bedford (1694)||William Russell, 1st Duke of Bedford||1694||1700||New creation
|-
|Duke of Devonshire (1694)||William Cavendish, 1st Duke of Devonshire||1694||1707||New creation
|-
|Duke of Newcastle-upon-Tyne (1694)||John Holles, 1st Duke of Newcastle-upon-Tyne||1694||1711||New creation
|-
|rowspan="2"|Marquess of Halifax (1682)||George Savile, 1st Marquess of Halifax||1682||1695||Died
|-
|William Savile, 2nd Marquess of Halifax||1695||1700||
|-
|rowspan="2"|Marquess of Powis (1687)||William Herbert, 1st Marquess of Powis||1687||1696||Died
|-
|William Herbert, 2nd Marquess of Powis||1696||1745||
|-
|Marquess of Normanby (1694)||John Sheffield, 1st Marquess of Normanby||1694||1721||New creation
|-
|Earl of Oxford (1142)||Aubrey de Vere, 20th Earl of Oxford||1632||1703||
|-
|Earl of Shrewsbury (1442)||Charles Talbot, 12th Earl of Shrewsbury||1668||1718||Created Duke of Shrewsbery, see above
|-
|Earl of Kent (1465)||Anthony Grey, 11th Earl of Kent||1651||1702||
|-
|Earl of Derby (1485)||William Stanley, 9th Earl of Derby||1672||1702||
|-
|Earl of Rutland (1525)||John Manners, 9th Earl of Rutlan||1679||1711||
|-
|Earl of Huntingdon (1529)||Theophilus Hastings, 7th Earl of Huntingdon||1656||1701||
|-
|Earl of Bedford (1550)||William Russell, 5th Earl of Bedford||1641||1700||Created Duke of Bedford, see above
|-
|Earl of Pembroke (1551)||Thomas Herbert, 8th Earl of Pembroke||1683||1733||
|-
|Earl of Devon (1553)||William Courtenay, de jure 5th Earl of Devon||1638||1702||
|-
|rowspan="3"|Earl of Lincoln (1572)||Edward Clinton, 5th Earl of Lincoln||1667||1692||Died
|-
|Francis Clinton, 6th Earl of Lincoln||1692||1693||Died
|-
|Henry Clinton, 7th Earl of Lincoln||1693||1728||
|-
|rowspan="2"|Earl of Suffolk (1603)||George Howard, 4th Earl of Suffolk||1689||1691||Died
|-
|Henry Howard, 5th Earl of Suffolk||1691||1709||
|-
|Earl of Dorset (1604)||Charles Sackville, 6th Earl of Dorset||1677||1706||
|-
|Earl of Exeter (1605)||John Cecil, 5th Earl of Exeter||1678||1700||
|-
|rowspan="2"|Earl of Salisbury (1605)||James Cecil, 4th Earl of Salisbury||1683||1694||Died
|-
|James Cecil, 5th Earl of Salisbury||1694||1728||
|-
|Earl of Bridgewater (1617)||John Egerton, 3rd Earl of Bridgewater||1686||1701||
|-
|Earl of Northampton (1618)||George Compton, 4th Earl of Northampton||1681||1727||
|-
|rowspan="2"|Earl of Leicester (1618)||Philip Sidney, 3rd Earl of Leicester||1677||1698||Died
|-
|Robert Sidney, 4th Earl of Leicester||1698||1702||
|-
|Earl of Warwick (1618)||Edward Rich, 6th Earl of Warwick||1675||1701||
|-
|Earl of Devonshire (1618)||William Cavendish, 4th Earl of Devonshire||1684||1707||Created Duke of Devonshire, see above
|-
|Earl of Denbigh (1622)||Basil Feilding, 4th Earl of Denbigh||1685||1717||
|-
|Earl of Bristol (1622)||John Digby, 3rd Earl of Bristol||1677||1698||Died, title extinct
|-
|Earl of Clare (1624)||John Holles, 4th Earl of Clare||1689||1711||Created Duke of Newcastle-upon-Tyne, see above
|-
|Earl of Bolingbroke (1624)||Paulet St John, 3rd Earl of Bolingbroke||1688||1711||
|-
|rowspan="4"|Earl of Westmorland (1624)||Charles Fane, 3rd Earl of Westmorland||1666||1691||Died
|-
|Vere Fane, 4th Earl of Westmorland||1691||1693||Died
|-
|Vere Fane, 5th Earl of Westmorland||1693||1699||Died
|-
|Thomas Fane, 6th Earl of Westmorland||1699||1736||
|-
|Earl of Manchester (1626)||Charles Montagu, 4th Earl of Manchester||1683||1722||
|-
|Earl of Mulgrave (1626)||John Sheffield, 3rd Earl of Mulgrave||1658||1721||Created Marquess of Normanby, see above
|-
|Earl of Berkshire (1626)||Thomas Howard, 3rd Earl of Berkshire||1679||1706||
|-
|rowspan="2"|Earl Rivers (1626)||Thomas Savage, 3rd Earl Rivers||1654||1694||Died
|-
|Richard Savage, 4th Earl Rivers||1694||1712||
|-
|Earl of Lindsey (1626)||Robert Bertie, 3rd Earl of Lindsey||1666||1701||
|-
|rowspan="2"|Earl of Peterborough (1628)||Henry Mordaunt, 2nd Earl of Peterborough||1643||1697||Died
|-
|Charles Mordaunt, 3rd Earl of Peterborough||1697||1735||
|-
|Earl of Stamford (1628)||Thomas Grey, 2nd Earl of Stamford||1673||1720||
|-
|Earl of Winchilsea (1628)||Charles Finch, 4th Earl of Winchilsea||1689||1712||
|-
|rowspan="2"|Earl of Kingston-upon-Hull (1628)||William Pierrepont, 4th Earl of Kingston-upon-Hull||1682||1690||Died
|-
|Evelyn Pierrepont, 5th Earl of Kingston-upon-Hull||1690||1726||
|-
|Earl of Carnarvon (1628)||Charles Dormer, 2nd Earl of Carnarvon||1643||1709||
|-
|Earl of Chesterfield (1628)||Philip Stanhope, 2nd Earl of Chesterfield||1656||1714||
|-
|Earl of Thanet (1628)||Thomas Tufton, 6th Earl of Thanet||1684||1729||
|-
|Earl of Strafford (1640)||William Wentworth, 2nd Earl of Strafford||1662||1695||Died, title extinct; Barony of Raby succeeded by a cousin, see below
|-
|Earl of Sunderland (1643)||Robert Spencer, 2nd Earl of Sunderland||1643||1702||
|-
|Earl of Scarsdale (1645)||Robert Leke, 3rd Earl of Scarsdale||1681||1707||
|-
|Earl of Sandwich (1660)||Edward Montagu, 3rd Earl of Sandwich||1688||1729||
|-
|rowspan="2"|Earl of Anglesey (1661)||James Annesley, 2nd Earl of Anglesey||1686||1690||Died
|-
|James Annesley, 3rd Earl of Anglesey||1690||1702||
|-
|Earl of Bath (1661)||John Granville, 1st Earl of Bath||1661||1701||
|-
|Earl of Cardigan (1661)||Robert Brudenell, 2nd Earl of Cardigan||1663||1703||
|-
|Earl of Clarendon (1661)||Henry Hyde, 2nd Earl of Clarendon||1674||1709||
|-
|Earl of Essex (1661)||Algernon Capell, 2nd Earl of Essex||1683||1710||
|-
|rowspan="2"|Earl of Carlisle (1661)||Edward Howard, 2nd Earl of Carlisle||1685||1692||Died
|-
|Charles Howard, 3rd Earl of Carlisle||1692||1738||
|-
|Earl of Craven (1664)||William Craven, 1st Earl of Craven||1664||1697||Died, title extinct
|-
|Earl of Ailesbury (1664)||Thomas Bruce, 2nd Earl of Ailesbury||1685||1741||Earl of Elgin in the Peerage of Scotland
|-
|rowspan="2"|Earl of Burlington (1664)||Richard Boyle, 1st Earl of Burlington||1664||1698||Earl of Cork in the Peerage of Ireland
|-
|Charles Boyle, 2nd Earl of Burlington||1698||1704||Earl of Cork in the Peerage of Ireland
|-
|Earl of Arlington (1672)||Isabella Fitzroy, 2nd Countess of Arlington||1685||1723||
|-
|rowspan="2"|Earl of Shaftesbury (1672)||Anthony Ashley-Cooper, 2nd Earl of Shaftesbury||1683||1699||Died
|-
|Anthony Ashley-Cooper, 3rd Earl of Shaftesbury||1699||1713||
|-
|Earl of Lichfield (1674)||Edward Lee, 1st Earl of Lichfield||1674||1716||
|-
|Earl of Sussex (1674)||Thomas Lennard, 1st Earl of Sussex||1674||1715||
|-
|Earl of Feversham (1676)||Louis de Duras, 2nd Earl of Feversham||1677||1709||
|-
|Earl of Radnor (1679)||Charles Robartes, 2nd Earl of Radnor||1685||1723||
|-
|rowspan="2"|Earl of Macclesfield (1679)||Charles Gerard, 1st Earl of Macclesfield||1679||1694||Died
|-
|Charles Gerard, 2nd Earl of Macclesfield||1695||1701||
|-
|Earl of Yarmouth (1679)||William Paston, 2nd Earl of Yarmouth||1683||1732||
|-
|rowspan="2"|Earl of Berkeley (1679)||George Berkeley, 1st Earl of Berkeley||1679||1698||Died
|-
|Charles Berkeley, 2nd Earl of Berkeley||1698||1710||
|-
|Earl of Nottingham (1681)||Daniel Finch, 2nd Earl of Nottingham||1682||1730||
|-
|Earl of Rochester (1682)||Laurence Hyde, 1st Earl of Rochester||1682||1711||
|-
|rowspan="2"|Earl of Abingdon (1682)||James Bertie, 1st Earl of Abingdon||1682||1699||Died
|-
|Montagu Venables-Bertie, 2nd Earl of Abingdon||1699||1743||
|-
|rowspan="2"|Earl of Gainsborough (1682)||Wriothesley Noel, 2nd Earl of Gainsborough||1689||1690||
|-
|Baptist Noel, 3rd Earl of Gainsborough||1690||1714||
|-
|Earl of Plymouth (1682)||Other Windsor, 2nd Earl of Plymouth||1687||1727||
|-
|rowspan="2"|Earl of Holderness (1682)||Conyers Darcy, 2nd Earl of Holderness||1689||1692||Died
|-
|Robert Darcy, 3rd Earl of Holderness||1692||1721||
|-
|Earl of Dorchester (1686)||Catherine Sedley, Countess of Dorchester||1686||1717||
|-
|rowspan="2"|Earl of Derwentwater (1688)||Francis Radclyffe, 1st Earl of Derwentwater||1688||1697||Died
|-
|Edward Radclyffe, 2nd Earl of Derwentwater||1697||1705||
|-
|Earl of Stafford (1688)||Mary Stafford, Countess of Stafford||1688||1694||Died, title extinct
|-
|Earl of Stafford (1688)||Henry Stafford Howard, 1st Earl of Stafford||1688||1719||
|-
|Earl of Fauconberg (1689)||Thomas Belasyse, 1st Earl Fauconberg||1689||1700||
|-
|Earl of Marlborough (1689)||John Churchill, 1st Earl of Marlborough||1689||1722||
|-
|Earl of Montagu (1689)||Ralph Montagu, 1st Earl of Montagu||1689||1709||
|-
|Earl of Portland (1689)||William Bentinck, 1st Earl of Portland||1689||1709||
|-
|Earl of Monmouth (1689)||Charles Mordaunt, 1st Earl of Monmouth||1689||1735||Succeeded to the more senior Earldom of Peterborough, see above
|-
|Earl of Torrington (1689)||Arthur Herbert, 1st Earl of Torrington||1689||1716||
|-
|rowspan="2"|Earl of Warrington (1690)||Henry Booth, 1st Earl of Warrington||1690||1694||New creation; died
|-
|George Booth, 2nd Earl of Warrington||1694||1758||
|-
|Earl of Scarbrough (1690)||Richard Lumley, 1st Earl of Scarbrough||1690||1721||New creation
|-
|Earl of Bradford (1694)||Francis Newport, 1st Earl of Bradford||1694||1708||New creation
|-
|Earl of Romney (1694)||Henry Sydney, 1st Earl of Romney||1694||1704||New creation
|-
|Earl of Rochford (1695)||William Nassau de Zuylestein, 1st Earl of Rochford||1695||1708||New creation
|-
|Earl of Tankerville (1695)||Ford Grey, 1st Earl of Tankerville||1695||1701||New creation
|-
|Earl of Albemarle (1697)||Arnold van Keppel, 1st Earl of Albemarle||1697||1718||New creation
|-
|rowspan="2"|Earl of Coventry (1697)||Thomas Coventry, 1st Earl of Coventry||1697||1697||New creation; died
|-
|Thomas Coventry, 2nd Earl of Coventry||1699||1710||
|-
|Earl of Orford (1697)||Edward Russell, 1st Earl of Orford||1697||1727||New creation
|-
|Earl of Jersey (1697)||Edward Villiers, 1st Earl of Jersey||1697||1711||New creation; Viscount Villiers in 1691
|-
|Earl of Grantham (1698)||Henry de Nassau d'Auverquerque, 1st Earl of Grantham||1698||1754||New creation
|-
|Viscount Hereford (1550)||Edward Devereux, 8th Viscount Hereford||1683||1700||
|-
|Viscount Montagu (1554)||Francis Browne, 4th Viscount Montagu||1682||1708||
|-
|rowspan="2"|Viscount Saye and Sele (1624)||William Fiennes, 3rd Viscount Saye and Sele||1674||1698||Died
|-
|Nathaniel Fiennes, 4th Viscount Saye and Sele||1698||1710||
|-
|Viscount Bayning of Newport (1675)||Francis Newport, 1st Viscount Newport||1675||1708||Created Earl of Bradford, see above
|-
|Viscount Hatton (1682)||Christopher Hatton, 1st Viscount Hatton||1682||1706||
|-
|Viscount Townshend (1682)||Charles Townshend, 2nd Viscount Townshend||1687||1738||
|-
|Viscount Weymouth (1682)||Thomas Thynne, 1st Viscount Weymouth||1682||1714||
|-
|Viscount Lumley (1689)||Richard Lumley, 1st Viscount Lumley||1689||1721||Created Earl of Scarbrough, see above
|-
|Viscount Sydney (1689)||Henry Sydney, 1st Viscount Sydney||1689||1704||Created Earl of Romney, see above
|-
|Viscount de Longueville (1690)||Henry Yelverton, 1st Viscount Longueville||1690||1704||New creation
|-
|Viscount Lonsdale (1690)||John Lowther, 1st Viscount Lonsdale||1699||1700||New creation
|-
|Baron FitzWalter (1295)||Charles Mildmay, 18th Baron FitzWalter||1679||1728||
|- 
|Baron Ferrers of Chartley (1299)||Robert Shirley, 14th Baron Ferrers of Chartley||1677||1717||
|- 
|Baron Morley (1299)||Thomas Parker, 15th Baron Morley||1655||1697||Died, Barony fell into abeyance
|- 
|Baron Grey of Ruthyn (1325)||Henry Yelverton, 15th Baron Grey of Ruthyn||1679||1704||Created Viscount Longueville in 1690, Barony held by his heirs until 1799
|- 
|rowspan="2"|Baron Dudley (1440)||Frances Ward, 6th Baroness Dudley||1643||1697||Died
|- 
|Edward Ward, 7th Baron Dudley||1697||1701||
|- 
|Baron Stourton (1448)||Edward Stourton, 13th Baron Stourton||1685||1720||
|- 
|Baron Willoughby de Broke (1491)||Richard Verney, 11th Baron Willoughby de Broke||1683||1711||
|- 
|Baron Monteagle (1514)||Thomas Parker, 6th Baron Monteagle||1655||1697||Died, Barony fell into abeyance
|-
|rowspan="2"|Baron Wentworth (1529)||Anne Lovelace, 7th Baroness Wentworth||1686||1697||Died
|-
|Martha Johnson, 8th Baroness Wentworth||1697||1745||
|-
|Baron Mordaunt (1532)||Mary Howard, 7th Baroness Mordaunt||1697||1705||Barony previously held by the Earls of Peterborough
|-
|Baron Eure (1544)||Ralph Eure, 7th Baron Eure||1672||1707||
|-
|rowspan="2"|Baron Wharton (1545)||Philip Wharton, 4th Baron Wharton||1625||1695||Died
|-
|Thomas Wharton, 5th Baron Wharton||1695||1715||
|-
|Baron Willoughby of Parham (1547)||Henry Willoughby, de jure 12th Baron Willoughby of Parham||1685||1722||
|-
|Baron Paget (1552)||William Paget, 6th Baron Paget||1678||1713||
|-
|rowspan="2"|Baron North (1554)||Charles North, 5th Baron North||1677||1691||Died
|-
|William North, 6th Baron North||1691||1734||
|-
|rowspan="2"|Baron Howard of Effingham (1554)||Francis Howard, 5th Baron Howard of Effingham||1681||1695||Died
|-
|Thomas Howard, 6th Baron Howard of Effingham||1695||1725||
|-
|Baron Chandos (1554)||James Brydges, 8th Baron Chandos||1676||1714||
|-
|rowspan="2"|Baron Hunsdon (1559)||Robert Carey, 6th Baron Hunsdon||1677||1692||Died
|-
|Robert Carey, 7th Baron Hunsdon||1692||1702||
|-
|Baron De La Warr (1570)||John West, 6th Baron De La Warr||1687||1723||
|-
|Baron Gerard (1603)||Charles Gerard, 6th Baron Gerard||1684||1707||
|-
|Baron Petre (1603)||Thomas Petre, 6th Baron Petre||1684||1706||
|-
|rowspan="2"|Baron Arundell of Wardour (1605)||Henry Arundell, 3rd Baron Arundell of Wardour||1643||1694||Died
|-
|Thomas Arundell, 4th Baron Arundell of Wardour||1694||1712||
|-
|Baron Clifton (1608)||Katherine O'Brien, 7th Baroness Clifton||1672||1702||
|-
|rowspan="3"|Baron Teynham (1616)||John Roper, 6th Baron Teynham||1689||1697||Died
|-
|Christopher Roper, 7th Baron Teynham||1697||1699||Died
|-
|Henry Roper, 8th Baron Teynham||1699||1723||
|-
|Baron Brooke (1621)||Fulke Greville, 5th Baron Brooke||1677||1710||
|-
|Baron Grey of Warke (1624)||Ford Grey, 3rd Baron Grey of Werke||1674||1701||Created Earl of Tankerville in 1695, see above
|-
|Baron Craven (1627)||William Craven, 2nd Baron Craven||1697||1711||Barony previously held by the Earl of Craven
|-
|rowspan="2"|Baron Lovelace (1627)||John Lovelace, 3rd Baron Lovelace||1670||1693||Died
|-
|John Lovelace, 4th Baron Lovelace||1693||1709||
|-
|Baron Poulett (1627)||John Poulett, 4th Baron Poulett||1679||1743||
|-
|Baron Clifford (1628)||Elizabeth Boyle, Baroness Clifford||1643||1691||Died, Barony succeeded by the Viscount Dungarvan
|-
|rowspan="2"|Baron Maynard (1628)||William Maynard, 2nd Baron Maynard||1640||1688/9||Died
|-
|Banastre Maynard, 3rd Baron Maynard||1688/9||1718||
|-
|Baron Coventry (1628)||Thomas Coventry, 5th Baron Coventry||1687||1699||Created Earl of Coventry, see above
|-
|Baron Mohun of Okehampton (1628)||Charles Mohun, 4th Baron Mohun of Okehampton||1677||1712||
|-
|Baron Herbert of Chirbury (1629)||Henry Herbert, 4th Baron Herbert of Chirbury||1678||1691||Died, title extinct
|-
|Baron Herbert of Chirbury (1641)||Thomas Wentworth, 3rd Baron Raby||1695||1739||Title previously held by the Earls of Strafford
|-
|Baron Leigh (1643)||Thomas Leigh, 2nd Baron Leigh||1672||1710||
|-
|Baron Jermyn (1643)||Thomas Jermyn, 2nd Baron Jermyn||1684||1703||
|-
|rowspan="2"|Baron Byron (1643)||William Byron, 3rd Baron Byron||1679||1695||Died
|-
|William Byron, 4th Baron Byron||1695||1736||
|-
|rowspan="2"|Baron Widdrington (1643)||William Widdrington, 3rd Baron Widdrington||1675||1695||Died
|-
|William Widdrington, 4th Baron Widdrington||1695||1716||
|-
|Baron Ward (1644)||Edward Ward, 2nd Baron Ward||1670||1701||Succeeded to the more senior Barony of Dudley, see above
|-
|Baron Colepeper (1644)||John Colepeper, 3rd Baron of Colepeper||1689||1719||
|-
|Baron Lucas of Shenfield (1645)||Robert Lucas, 3rd Baron Lucas of Shenfield||1688||1705||
|-
|Baron Belasyse (1645)||Henry Belasyse, 2nd Baron Belasyse||1689||1691||Died, title extinct
|-
|Baron Rockingham (1645)||Lewis Watson, 3rd Baron Rockingham||1689||1724||
|-
|Baron Lexinton (1645)||Robert Sutton, 2nd Baron Lexinton||1668||1723||
|-
|Baron Langdale (1658)||Marmaduke Langdale, 2nd Baron Langdale||1661||1703||
|-
|rowspan="2"|Baron Berkeley of Stratton (1658)||John Berkeley, 3rd Baron Berkeley of Stratton||1681||1697||Died
|-
|William Berkeley, 4th Baron Berkeley of Stratton||1697||1741||
|-
|rowspan="2"|Baron Cornwallis (1661)||Charles Cornwallis, 3rd Baron Cornwallis||1673||1698||Died
|-
|Charles Cornwallis, 4th Baron Cornwallis||1698||1722||
|-
|rowspan="2"|Baron Crew (1661)||Thomas Crew, 2nd Baron Crew||1679||1697||Died
|-
|Nathaniel Crew, 3rd Baron Crew||1697||1721||
|-
|Baron Delamer (1661)||Henry Booth, 2nd Baron Delamer||1684||1694||Created Earl of Warrington, see above
|-
|rowspan="2"|Baron Holles (1661)||Francis Holles, 2nd Baron Holles||1680||1690||Died
|-
|Denzil Holles, 3rd Baron Holles||1690||1692||Died, title extinct
|-
|Baron (A)bergavenny (1662)||George Nevill, 12th Baron Bergavenny||1666||1695||Died, title extinct or fell into abeyance
|-
|Baron Lucas of Crudwell (1663)||Mary Grey, 1st Baroness Lucas||1663||1702||
|-
|rowspan="2"|Baron Arundell of Trerice (1664)||John Arundell, 2nd Baron Arundell of Trerice||1687||1698||Died
|-
|John Arundell, 3rd Baron Arundell of Trerice||1698||1706||
|-
|Baron Clifford of Chudleigh (1672)||Hugh Clifford, 2nd Baron Clifford of Chudleigh||1673||1730||
|-
|Baron Belasyse of Osgodby (1674)||Susan Belasyse, Baroness Belasyse||1674||1713||
|-
|rowspan="2"|Baron Willoughby of Parham (1680)||Thomas Willoughby, 11th Baron Willoughby of Parham||1680||1692||Died
|-
|Hugh Willoughby, 12th Baron Willoughby of Parham||1692||1712||
|-
|rowspan="2"|Baron Carteret (1681)||George Carteret, 1st Baron Carteret||1681||1695||Died
|-
|John Carteret, 2nd Baron Carteret||1695||1763||
|-
|rowspan="2"|Baron Ossulston (1682)||John Bennet, 1st Baron Ossulston||1682||1695||Died
|-
|Charles Bennet, 2nd Baron Ossulston||1695||1722||
|-
|rowspan="2"|Baron Dartmouth (1682)||George Legge, 1st Baron Dartmouth||1682||1691||Died
|-
|William Legge, 2nd Baron Dartmouth||1691||1750||
|-
|rowspan="2"|Baron Stawell (1683)||John Stawell, 2nd Baron Stawell||1689||1692||Died
|-
|William Stawell, 3rd Baron Stawell||1692||1742||
|-
|Baron Guilford (1683)||Francis North, 2nd Baron Guilford||1685||1729||
|-
|Baron Godolphin (1684)||Sidney Godolphin, 1st Baron Godolphin||1684||1712||
|-
|Baron Jeffreys (1685)||John Jeffreys, 2nd Baron Jeffreys||1689||1702||
|-
|Baron Waldegrave (1686)||James Waldegrave, 2nd Baron Waldegrave||1689||1741||
|-
|Baron Griffin (1688)||Edward Griffin, 1st Baron Griffin||1688||1710||
|-
|Baron Ashburnham (1689)||John Ashburnham, 1st Baron Ashburnham||1689||1710||
|-
|Baron Cholmondeley (1689)||Hugh Cholmondeley, 1st Baron Cholmondeley||1689||1725||
|-
|Baron Capell of Tewkesbury (1692)||Henry Capell, 1st Baron Capell of Tewkesbury||1692||1696||New creation; died, title extinct
|-
|Baron Leominster (1692)||William Fermor, 1st Baron Leominster||1692||1711||New creation
|-
|Baron Herbert of Chirbury (1694)||Henry Herbert, 1st Baron Herbert of Chirbury||1694||1709||New creation
|-
|Baron Abergavenny (1695)||George Nevill, 13th Baron Bergavenny||1695||1721||New creation
|-
|Baron Haversham (1696)||John Thompson, 1st Baron Haversham||1696||1710||New creation
|-
|Baron Somers (1697)||John Somers, 1st Baron Somers||1697||1716||New creation
|-
|Baron Barnard (1698)||Christopher Vane, 1st Baron Barnard||1698||1723||New creation
|-
|}

Peerage of Scotland

|Duke of Rothesay (1398)||James Stuart, Duke of Rothesay||1688||1702||
|-
|rowspan=2|Duke of Hamilton (1643)||Anne Hamilton, 3rd Duchess of Hamilton||1651||1698||Died
|-
|James Hamilton, 4th Duke of Hamilton||1698||1712||
|-
|Duke of Buccleuch (1663)||Anne Scott, 1st Duchess of Buccleuch||1663||1732||
|-
|Duke of Lennox (1675)||Charles Lennox, 1st Duke of Lennox||1675||1723||
|-
|rowspan=2|Duke of Queensberry (1684)||William Douglas, 1st Duke of Queensberry||1684||1695||Died
|-
|James Douglas, 2nd Duke of Queensberry||1695||1711||
|-
|Duke of Gordon (1684)||George Gordon, 1st Duke of Gordon||1684||1716||
|-
|Marquess of Douglas (1633)||James Douglas, 2nd Marquess of Douglas||1660||1700||
|-
|Marquess of Montrose (1644)||James Graham, 4th Marquess of Montrose||1684||1742||
|-
|Marquess of Atholl (1676)||John Murray, 1st Marquess of Atholl||1676||1703||
|-
|rowspan=2|Marquess of Tweeddale (1694)||John Hay, 1st Marquess of Tweeddale||1694||1697||New creation, died
|-
|John Hay, 2nd Marquess of Tweeddale||1697||1713||
|-
|Earl of Argyll (1457)||Archibald Campbell, 10th Earl of Argyll||1685||1703||
|-
|rowspan=2|Earl of Crawford (1398)||William Lindsay, 18th Earl of Crawford||1678||1698||Died
|-
|John Lindsay, 19th Earl of Crawford||1698||1713||
|-
|Earl of Erroll (1452)||John Hay, 12th Earl of Erroll||1674||1704||
|-
|rowspan=2|Earl Marischal (1458)||George Keith, 8th Earl Marischal||1671||1694||Died
|-
|William Keith, 9th Earl Marischal||1694||1712||
|-
|Earl of Sutherland (1235)||George Gordon, 15th Earl of Sutherland||1679||1703||
|-
|Earl of Mar (1114)||John Erskine, Earl of Mar||1689||1732||
|-
|Earl of Rothes (1458)||Margaret Leslie, 8th Countess of Rothes||1681||1700||
|-
|Earl of Morton (1458)||James Douglas, 11th Earl of Morton||1686||1715||
|-
|Earl of Menteith (1427)||William Graham, 8th Earl of Menteith||1661||1694||Died; peerage either extinct or dormant on his death
|-
|Earl of Glencairn (1488)||John Cunningham, 11th Earl of Glencairn||1670||1703||
|-
|Earl of Eglinton (1507)||Alexander Montgomerie, 8th Earl of Eglinton||1669||1701||
|-
|Earl of Cassilis (1509)||John Kennedy, 7th Earl of Cassilis||1668||1701||
|-
|rowspan=2|Earl of Caithness (1455)||George Sinclair, 7th Earl of Caithness||1681||1698||Died
|-
|John Sinclair, 8th Earl of Caithness||1698||1705||
|-
|rowspan=2|Earl of Buchan (1469)||William Erskine, 8th Earl of Buchan||1664||1695||Died
|-
|David Erskine, 9th Earl of Buchan||1695||1745||
|-
|Earl of Moray (1562)||Alexander Stuart, 5th Earl of Moray||1653||1701||
|-
|rowspan=3|Earl of Linlithgow (1600)||George Livingston, 3rd Earl of Linlithgow||1650||1690||Died
|-
|George Livingston, 4th Earl of Linlithgow||1690||1695||
|-
|James Livingston, 5th Earl of Linlithgow||1695||1716||
|-
|Earl of Winton (1600)||George Seton, 4th Earl of Winton||1650||1704||
|-
|Earl of Home (1605)||Charles Home, 6th Earl of Home||1687||1706||
|-
|Earl of Perth (1605)||James Drummond, 4th Earl of Perth||1675||1716||
|-
|Earl of Dunfermline (1605)||James Seton, 4th Earl of Dunfermline||1677||1690||Title forfeited
|-
|Earl of Wigtown (1606)||John Fleming, 6th Earl of Wigtown||1681||1744||
|-
|rowspan=2|Earl of Abercorn (1606)||Claud Hamilton, 4th Earl of Abercorn||1680||1691||
|-
|Charles Hamilton, 5th Earl of Abercorn||1691||1701||
|-
|rowspan=2|Earl of Strathmore and Kinghorne (1606)||Patrick Lyon, 3rd Earl of Strathmore and Kinghorne||1646||1695||Died
|-
|John Lyon, 4th Earl of Strathmore and Kinghorne||1695||1712||
|-
|rowspan=2|Earl of Roxburghe (1616)||Robert Ker, 4th Earl of Roxburghe||1682||1696||Died
|-
|John Ker, 5th Earl of Roxburghe||1696||1741||
|-
|Earl of Kellie (1619)||Alexander Erskine, 4th Earl of Kellie||1677||1710||
|-
|Earl of Haddington (1619)||Thomas Hamilton, 6th Earl of Haddington||1685||1735||
|-
|rowspan=2|Earl of Nithsdale (1620)||Robert Maxwell, 4th Earl of Nithsdale||1677||1696||Died
|-
|William Maxwell, 5th Earl of Nithsdale||1696||1716||
|-
|rowspan=3|Earl of Galloway (1623)||Alexander Stewart, 3rd Earl of Galloway||1671||1690||Died
|-
|Alexander Stewart, 4th Earl of Galloway||1690||1694||Died
|-
|James Stewart, 5th Earl of Galloway||1694||1746||
|-
|Earl of Seaforth (1623)||Kenneth Mackenzie, 4th Earl of Seaforth||1678||1701||
|-
|rowspan=3|Earl of Lauderdale (1624)||Charles Maitland, 3rd Earl of Lauderdale||1682||1691||Died
|-
|Richard Maitland, 4th Earl of Lauderdale||1691||1695||Died
|-
|John Maitland, 5th Earl of Lauderdale||1695||1710||
|-
|Earl of Lothian (1631)||Robert Kerr, 2nd Earl of Lothian||1675||1703||
|-
|Earl of Airth (1633)||William Graham, 2nd Earl of Airth||1661||1694||Died, title dormant
|-
|Earl of Loudoun (1633)||Hugh Campbell, 3rd Earl of Loudoun||1684||1731||
|-
|Earl of Kinnoull (1633)||William Hay, 6th Earl of Kinnoull||1687||1709||
|-
|rowspan=3|Earl of Dumfries (1633)||William Crichton, 2nd Earl of Dumfries||1643||1691||Died
|-
|William Crichton, 3rd Earl of Dumfries||1691||1694||Died
|-
|Penelope Crichton, 4th Countess of Dumfries||1694||1742||
|-
|rowspan=2|Earl of Stirling (1633)||Henry Alexander, 4th Earl of Stirling||1644||1691||Died
|-
|Henry Alexander, 5th Earl of Stirling||1691||1739||
|-
|Earl of Elgin (1633)||Thomas Bruce, 3rd Earl of Elgin||1685||1741||
|-
|rowspan=2|Earl of Southesk (1633)||Charles Carnegie, 4th Earl of Southesk||1688||1699||Died
|-
|James Carnegie, 5th Earl of Southesk||1699||1716||
|-
|Earl of Traquair (1633)||Charles Stewart, 4th Earl of Traquair||1673||1741||
|-
|Earl of Ancram (1633)||Charles Kerr, 2nd Earl of Ancram||1654||1690||Died; Title succeeded by the Earl of Lothian, see above
|-
|Earl of Wemyss (1633)||Margaret Wemyss, 3rd Countess of Wemyss||1679||1705||
|-
|rowspan=2|Earl of Dalhousie (1633)||George Ramsay, 4th Earl of Dalhousie||1682||1696||Died
|-
|William Ramsay, 5th Earl of Dalhousie||1696||1710||
|-
|Earl of Findlater (1638)||James Ogilvy, 3rd Earl of Findlater||1658||1711||
|-
|Earl of Airlie (1639)||James Ogilvy, 2nd Earl of Airlie||1665||1703||
|-
|Earl of Carnwath (1639)||John Dalzell, 4th Earl of Carnwath||1683||1702||
|-
|rowspan=2|Earl of Callendar (1641)||Alexander Livingston, 3rd Earl of Callendar||1685||1692||Died
|-
|James Livingston, 4th Earl of Callendar||1692||1716||
|-
|Earl of Leven (1641)||David Leslie, 3rd Earl of Leven||1676||1728||
|-
|rowspan=2|Earl of Dysart (1643)||Elizabeth Tollemache, 2nd Countess of Dysart||1654||1698||Died
|-
|Lionel Tollemache, 3rd Earl of Dysart||1698||1727||
|-
|Earl of Panmure (1646)||James Maule, 4th Earl of Panmure||1686||1716||
|-
|rowspan=2|Earl of Selkirk (1646)||William Hamilton, 1st Earl of Selkirk||1646||1694||Died
|-
|Charles Douglas, 2nd Earl of Selkirk||1694||1739||
|-
|Earl of Tweeddale (1646)||John Hay, 2nd Earl of Tweeddale||1653||1697||Created Marquess of Tweeddale, see above
|-
|Earl of Northesk (1647)||David Carnegie, 4th Earl of Northesk||1688||1729||
|-
|Earl of Kincardine (1647)||Alexander Bruce, 3rd Earl of Kincardine||1680||1705||
|-
|Earl of Balcarres (1651)||Colin Lindsay, 3rd Earl of Balcarres||1662||1722||
|-
|Earl of Tarras (1660)||Walter Scott, Earl of Tarras||1660||1693||Died; peerage was for life only
|-
|Earl of Aboyne (1660)||Charles Gordon, 2nd Earl of Aboyne||1681||1702||
|-
|Earl of Middleton (1660)||Charles Middleton, 2nd Earl of Middleton||1674||1695||Attainted
|-
|Earl of Newburgh (1660)||Charles Livingston, 2nd Earl of Newburgh||1670||1755||
|-
|Earl of Annandale and Hartfell (1661)||William Johnstone, 2nd Earl of Annandale and Hartfell||1672||1721||
|-
|rowspan=3|Earl of Kilmarnock (1661)||William Boyd, 1st Earl of Kilmarnock||1661||1692||Died
|-
|William Boyd, 2nd Earl of Kilmarnock||1692||1692||Died
|-
|William Boyd, 3rd Earl of Kilmarnock||1692||1717||
|-
|Earl of Forfar (1661)||Archibald Douglas, 1st Earl of Forfar||1661||1712||
|-
|rowspan=2|Earl of Dundonald (1669)||John Cochrane, 2nd Earl of Dundonald||1685||1690||Died
|-
|William Cochrane, 3rd Earl of Dundonald||1690||1705||
|-
|rowspan=2|Earl of Dumbarton (1675)||George Douglas, 1st Earl of Dumbarton||1675||1692||Died
|-
|George Douglas, 2nd Earl of Dumbarton||1692||1749||
|-
|Earl of Kintore (1677)||John Keith, 1st Earl of Kintore||1677||1714||
|-
|Earl of Breadalbane and Holland (1677)||John Campbell, 1st Earl of Breadalbane and Holland||1677||1717||
|-
|Earl of Aberdeen (1682)||George Gordon, 1st Earl of Aberdeen||1682||1720||
|-
|Earl of Melfort (1686)||John Drummond, 1st Earl of Melfort||1686||1695||Attainted; peerage remained under attainder until 1853
|-
|Earl of Dunmore (1686)||Charles Murray, 1st Earl of Dunmore||1686||1710||
|-
|Earl of Melville (1690)||George Melville, 1st Earl of Melville||1690||1707||New creation
|-
|Earl of Orkney (1696)||George Hamilton, 1st Earl of Orkney||1696||1737||New creation
|-
|Earl of Tullibardine (1696)||John Murray, 1st Earl of Tullibardine||1696||1724||New creation
|-
|Earl of Ruglen (1697)||John Hamilton, 1st Earl of Ruglen||1697||1744||New creation
|-
|Earl of March (1697)||William Douglas, 1st Earl of March||1697||1705||New creation
|-
|Earl of Marchmont (1697)||Patrick Hume, 1st Earl of Marchmont||1697||1724||New creation; cr. Lord Polwarth in 1690
|-
|rowspan=2|Viscount of Falkland (1620)||Anthony Cary, 5th Viscount of Falkland||1663||1694||Died
|-
|Lucius Henry Cary, 6th Viscount of Falkland||1694||1730||
|-
|Viscount of Dunbar (1620)||Robert Constable, 3rd Viscount of Dunbar||1668||1714||
|-
|Viscount of Stormont (1621)||David Murray, 5th Viscount of Stormont||1668||1731||
|-
|rowspan=2|Viscount of Kenmure (1633)||Alexander Gordon, 5th Viscount of Kenmure||1663||1698||Died
|-
|William Gordon, 6th Viscount of Kenmure||1698||1715||
|-
|rowspan=2|Viscount of Arbuthnott (1641)||Robert Arbuthnot, 3rd Viscount of Arbuthnott||1682||1694||Died
|-
|Robert Arbuthnot, 4th Viscount of Arbuthnott||1694||1710||
|-
|Viscount of Frendraught (1642)||Lewis Crichton, 4th Viscount of Frendraught||1686||1690||Title forfeited
|-
|Viscount of Oxfuird (1651)||Robert Makgill, 2nd Viscount of Oxfuird||1663||1706||
|-
|rowspan=2|Viscount of Kingston (1651)||Alexander Seton, 1st Viscount of Kingston||1651||1691||Died
|-
|Archibald Seton, 2nd Viscount of Kingston||1691||1713||
|-
|Viscount of Irvine (1661)||Arthur Ingram, 3rd Viscount of Irvine||1668||1702||
|-
|Viscount of Kilsyth (1661)||James Livingston, 2nd Viscount of Kilsyth||1661||1706||
|-
|rowspan=2|Viscount Preston (1681)||Richard Graham, 1st Viscount Preston||1681||1695||Died
|-
|Edward Graham, 2nd Viscount Preston||1695||1710||
|-
|rowspan=2|Viscount of Newhaven (1681)||Charles Cheyne, 1st Viscount Newhaven||1681||1698||Died
|-
|William Cheyne, 2nd Viscount Newhaven||1698||1728||
|-
|Viscount of Teviot (1685)||Robert Spencer, 1st Viscount Teviot||1685||1694||Died, title extinct
|-
|Viscount of Tarbat (1685)||George Mackenzie, 1st Viscount of Tarbat||1685||1714||
|-
|Viscount of Strathallan (1686)||William Drummond, 2nd Viscount Strathallan||1688||1702||
|-
|Viscount of Dundee (1688)||David Graham, 3rd Viscount of Dundee||1689||1690||Title forfeited
|-
|rowspan=2|Viscount of Stair (1690)||James Dalrymple, 1st Viscount of Stair||1690||1695||New creation; died
|-
|John Dalrymple, 2nd Viscount of Stair||1697||1707||
|-
|Viscount of Teviot (1696)||Thomas Livingston, 1st Viscount Teviot||1696||1711||New creation
|-
|Viscount Seafield (1698)||James Ogilvy, 1st Viscount Seafield||1698||1730||New creation
|-
|rowspan=2|Lord Somerville (1430)||James Somerville, 11th Lord Somerville||1677||1693||Died
|-
|James Somerville, 12th Lord Somerville||1693||1709||
|-
|rowspan=2|Lord Forbes (1442)||William Forbes, 11th Lord Forbes||1672||1697||Died
|-
|William Forbes, 12th Lord Forbes||1697||1716||
|-
|rowspan=2|Lord Saltoun (1445)||Alexander Fraser, 11th Lord Saltoun||1669||1693||Died
|-
|William Fraser, 12th Lord Saltoun||1693||1715||
|-
|Lord Gray (1445)||Patrick Gray, 8th Lord Gray||1663||1711||
|-
|Lord Sinclair (1449)||Henry St Clair, 10th Lord Sinclair||1676||1723||
|-
|Lord Oliphant (1455)||Charles Oliphant, 7th Lord Oliphant||1680||1709||
|-
|Lord Cathcart (1460)||Alan Cathcart, 6th Lord Cathcart||1628||1709||
|-
|rowspan=3|Lord Lovat (1464)||Hugh Fraser, 9th Lord Lovat||1672||1696||Died
|-
|Thomas Fraser, 10th Lord Lovat||1696||1699||Died
|-
|Simon Fraser, 11th Lord Lovat||1699||1746||
|-
|rowspan=2|Lord Sempill (1489)||Anne Abercromby, 9th Lady Sempill||1684||1695||Died
|-
|Francis Sempill, 10th Lord Sempill||1695||1716||
|-
|Lord Ross (1499)||William Ross, 12th Lord Ross||1682||1738||
|-
|Lord Elphinstone (1509)||John Elphinstone, 8th Lord Elphinstone||1669||1718||
|-
|rowspan=2|Lord Torphichen (1564)||Walter Sandilands, 6th Lord Torphichen||1649||1696||Died
|-
|James Sandilands, 7th Lord Torphichen||1696||1753||
|-
|Lord Lindores (1600)||John Leslie, 4th Lord Lindores||1666||1706||
|-
|Lord Colville of Culross (1604)||Alexander Colville, 5th Lord Colville of Culross||1680||1717||
|-
|Lord Balmerinoch (1606)||John Elphinstone, 3rd Lord Balmerino||1649||1704||
|-
|Lord Blantyre (1606)||Alexander Stuart, 5th Lord Blantyre||1670||1704||
|-
|Lord Balfour of Burleigh (1607)||Robert Balfour, 4th Lord Balfour of Burleigh||1688||1713||
|-
|Lord Cranstoun (1609)||William Cranstoun, 5th Lord Cranstoun||1688||1727||
|-
|Lord Dingwall (1609)||James Butler, 3rd Lord Dingwall||1684||1715||
|-
|rowspan=2|Lord Cardross (1610)||Henry Erskine, 3rd Lord Cardross||1671||1693||Died
|-
|David Erskine, 4th Lord Cardross||1693||1745||Succeeded to the Earldom of Buchan in 1695, see above
|-
|Lord Melville of Monymaill (1616)||George Melville, 4th Lord Melville||1643||1707||Created Earl of Melville, see above
|-
|rowspan=2|Lord Jedburgh (1622)||Robert Ker, 4th Lord Jedburgh||1670||1692||Died
|-
|William Ker, 5th Lord Jedburgh||1692||1722||
|-
|Lord Aston of Forfar (1627)||Walter Aston, 3rd Lord Aston of Forfar||1678||1714||
|-
|Lord Fairfax of Cameron (1627)||Thomas Fairfax, 5th Lord Fairfax of Cameron||1688||1710||
|-
|Lord Napier (1627)||Margaret Brisbane, 5th Lady Napier||1683||1706||
|-
|Lord Reay (1628)||George Mackay, 3rd Lord Reay||1681||1748||
|-
|Lord Cramond (1628)||Henry Richardson, 3rd Lord Cramond||1674||1701||
|-
|rowspan=3|Lord Forbes of Pitsligo (1633)||Alexander Forbes, 2nd Lord Forbes of Pitsligo||1636||1690||Died
|-
|Alexander Forbes, 3rd Lord Forbes of Pitsligo||1690||1690||Died
|-
|Alexander Forbes, 4th Lord Forbes of Pitsligo||1690||1746||
|-
|Lord Kirkcudbright (1633)||James Maclellan, 6th Lord Kirkcudbright||1678||1730||
|-
|Lord Fraser (1633)||Charles Fraser, 4th Lord Fraser||Abt 1680||1715||
|-
|Lord Forrester (1633)||William Forrester, 4th Lord Forrester||1681||1705||
|-
|rowspan=2|Lord Bargany (1641)||John Hamilton, 2nd Lord Bargany||1658||1693||Died
|-
|William Hamilton, 3rd Lord Bargany||1693||1712||
|-
|Lord Banff (1642)||George Ogilvy, 3rd Lord Banff||1668||1713||
|-
|Lord Elibank (1643)||Alexander Murray, 4th Lord Elibank||1687||1736||
|-
|Lord Dunkeld (1645)||James Galloway, 3rd Lord Dunkeld||1684||1690||Title forfeited
|-
|Lord Falconer of Halkerton (1646)||David Falconer, 3rd Lord Falconer of Halkerton||1684||1724||
|-
|Lord Belhaven and Stenton (1647)||John Hamilton, 2nd Lord Belhaven and Stenton||1679||1708||
|-
|Lord Carmichael (1647)||John Carmichael, 2nd Lord Carmichael||1672||1710||
|-
|Lord Duffus (1650)||James Sutherland, 2nd Lord Duffus||1674||1705||
|-
|Lord Rollo (1651)||Andrew Rollo, 3rd Lord Rollo||1669||1700||
|-
|Lord Ruthven of Freeland (1650)||David Ruthven, 2nd Lord Ruthven of Freeland||1673||1701||
|-
|Lord Rutherfurd (1661)||Robert Rutherfurd, 4th Lord Rutherfurd||1685||1724||
|-
|Lord Bellenden (1661)||John Bellenden, 2nd Lord Bellenden||1671||1707||
|-
|Lord Newark (1661)||David Leslie, 2nd Lord Newark||1682||1694||Died, title extinct
|-
|Lord Nairne (1681)||William Murray, 2nd Lord Nairne||1683||1716||
|-
|Lord Kinnaird (1682)||Patrick Kinnaird, 2nd Lord Kinnaird||1689||1701||
|-
|Lord Glasford (1685)||Francis Abercromby, Lord Glasford||1685||1703||
|-
|Lord Boyle of Kelburn, Stewartoun, Cumbrae, Finnick, Largs and Dalry (1699)||David Boyle, 1st Lord Boyle of Kelburn, Stewartoun, Cumbrae, Finnick, Largs and Dalry||1699||1733||New creation
|-
|Lord Portmore and Blackness (1699)||David Colyear, 1st Lord Portmore and Blackness||1699||1730||New creation
|-
|}

Peerage of Ireland

|Duke of Ormonde (1661)||James Butler, 2nd Duke of Ormonde||1688||1715||
|-
|Duke of Leinster (1691)||Meinhard Schomberg, 1st Duke of Leinster||1691||1719||New creation
|-
|Earl of Kildare (1316)||John FitzGerald, 18th Earl of Kildare||1664||1707||
|-
|Earl of Waterford (1446)||Charles Talbot, 12th Earl of Waterford||1667||1718||
|-
|Earl of Clanricarde (1543)||Richard Burke, 8th Earl of Clanricarde||1687||1708||
|-
|rowspan=2|Earl of Thomond (1543)||Henry O'Brien, 7th Earl of Thomond||1657||1691||Died
|-
|Henry O'Brien, 8th Earl of Thomond||1691||1741||
|-
|Earl of Castlehaven (1616)||James Tuchet, 5th Earl of Castlehaven||1686||1700||
|-
|rowspan=2|Earl of Cork (1620)||Richard Boyle, 2nd Earl of Cork||1643||1698||Died
|-
|Charles Boyle, 3rd Earl of Cork||1698||1703||
|-
|rowspan=2|Earl of Antrim (1620)||Alexander MacDonnell, 3rd Earl of Antrim||1682||1699||Died
|-
|Randal MacDonnell, 4th Earl of Antrim||1699||1721||
|-
|Earl of Westmeath (1621)||Richard Nugent, 3rd Earl of Westmeath||1684||1714||
|-
|Earl of Roscommon (1622)||Robert Dillon, 6th Earl of Roscommon||1689||1715||
|-
|Earl of Londonderry (1622)||Robert Ridgeway, 4th Earl of Londonderry||1672||1714||
|-
|Earl of Meath (1627)||Edward Brabazon, 4th Earl of Meath||1685||1707||
|-
|rowspan=3|Earl of Barrymore (1628)||Richard Barry, 2nd Earl of Barrymore||1642||1694||Died
|-
|Laurence Barry, 3rd Earl of Barrymore||1694||1699||Died
|-
|James Barry, 4th Earl of Barrymore||1699||1747||
|-
|Earl of Carbery (1628)||John Vaughan, 3rd Earl of Carbery||1687||1713||
|-
|Earl of Fingall (1628)||Peter Plunkett, 4th Earl of Fingall||1684||1718||
|-
|Earl of Desmond (1628)||Basil Feilding, 3rd Earl of Desmond||1685||1717||
|-
|Earl of Donegall (1647)||Arthur Chichester, 3rd Earl of Donegall||1678||1706||
|-
|rowspan=2|Earl of Cavan (1647)||Richard Lambart, 2nd Earl of Cavan||1660||1690||Died
|-
|Charles Lambart, 3rd Earl of Cavan||1690||1702||
|-
|Earl of Inchiquin (1654)||William O'Brien, 2nd Earl of Inchiquin||1674||1692||
|-
|Earl of Clancarty (1658)||Donough MacCarthy, 4th Earl of Clancarty||1676||1691||Peerage attainted
|-
|Earl of Orrery (1660)||Lionel Boyle, 3rd Earl of Orrery||1682||1703||
|-
|Earl of Mountrath (1660)||Charles Coote, 3rd Earl of Mountrath||1672||1709||
|-
|Earl of Drogheda (1661)||Henry Hamilton-Moore, 3rd Earl of Drogheda||1679||1714||
|-
|rowspan=2|Earl of Carlingford (1661)||Nicholas Taaffe, 2nd Earl of Carlingford||1677||1690||Died
|-
|Francis Taaffe 3rd Earl of Carlingford||1690||1704||
|-
|Earl of Mount Alexander (1661)||Hugh Montgomery, 2nd Earl of Mount Alexander||1663||1717||
|-
|Earl of Castlemaine (1661)||Roger Palmer, 1st Earl of Castlemaine||1661||1705||
|-
|rowspan=3|Earl of Tyrone (1673)||Richard Power, 1st Earl of Tyrone||1673||1690||Died
|-
|John Power, 2nd Earl of Tyrone||1690||1693||Died
|-
|James Power, 3rd Earl of Tyrone||1693||1704||
|-
|Earl of Longford (1677)||Francis Aungier, 1st Earl of Longford||1677||1700||
|-
|Earl of Ranelagh (1677)||Richard Jones, 1st Earl of Ranelagh||1677||1711||
|-
|rowspan=2|Earl of Granard (1684)||Arthur Forbes, 1st Earl of Granard||1684||1695||Died
|-
|Arthur Forbes, 2nd Earl of Granard||1695||1734||
|-
|Earl of Tyrconnell (1685)||Richard Talbot, 1st Earl of Tyrconnell||1685||1691||Peerage forfeit
|-
|rowspan=2|Earl of Limerick (1686)||William Dongan, 1st Earl of Limerick||1686||1698||Died
|-
|Thomas Dongan, 2nd Earl of Limerick||1698||1715||
|-
|Earl of Bellomont (1689)||Richard Coote, 1st Earl of Bellomont||1683||1701||
|-
|Earl of Athlone (1692)||Godert de Ginkell, 1st Earl of Athlone||1692||1703||New creation
|-
|Earl of Arran (1693)||Charles Butler, 1st Earl of Arran||1693||1758||New creation
|-
|Earl of Galway (1697)||Henri de Massue, Earl of Galway||1697||1720||New creation; also created Viscount Galway in 1692
|-
|Viscount Gormanston (1478)||Jenico Preston, 7th Viscount Gormanston||1643||1691||Declared an outlaw
|-
|Viscount Mountgarret (1550)||Richard Butler, 5th Viscount Mountgarret||1679||1706||
|-
|rowspan=2|Viscount Grandison (1621)||George Villiers, 4th Viscount Grandison||1661||1699||Died
|-
|John Villiers, 5th Viscount Grandison||1699||1766||
|-
|rowspan=2|Viscount Valentia (1622)||James Annesley, 3rd Viscount Valentia||1686||1690||Died
|-
|James Annesley, 4th Viscount Valentia||1690||1702||
|-
|rowspan=2|Viscount Dillon (1622)||Theobald Dillon, 7th Viscount Dillon||1682||1690||Died
|-
|Henry Dillon, 8th Viscount Dillon||1690||1713||
|-
|Viscount Loftus (1622)||Arthur Loftus, 3rd Viscount Loftus||1680||1725||
|-
|Viscount Beaumont of Swords (1622)||Thomas Beaumont, 3rd Viscount Beaumont of Swords||1658||1702||
|-
|Viscount Netterville (1622)||John Netterville, 4th Viscount Netterville||1689||1727||
|-
|rowspan=2|Viscount Magennis (1623)||Bryan Magennis, 5th Viscount Magennis||1684||1692||Died
|-
|Phelim Magennis, 6th Viscount Magennis||1692||1693||Peerage attainted
|-
|Viscount Kilmorey (1625)||Robert Needham, 7th Viscount Kilmorey||1687||1710||
|-
|Viscount Castleton (1627)||George Saunderson, 5th Viscount Castleton||1650||1714||
|-
|Viscount Mayo (1627)||Theobald Bourke, 6th Viscount Mayo||1681||1741||
|-
|Viscount Sarsfield (1627)||Dominick Sarsfield, 4th Viscount Sarsfield||1687||1691||Peerage forfeit 
|-
|Viscount Chaworth (1628)||Patrick Chaworth, 3rd Viscount Chaworth||1644||1693||Died, title extinct
|-
|Viscount Lumley (1628)||Richard Lumley, 2nd Viscount Lumley||1663||1721||
|-
|rowspan=2|Viscount Molyneux (1628)||Caryll Molyneux, 3rd Viscount Molyneux||1654||1699||Died
|-
|William Molyneux, 4th Viscount Molyneux||1699||1717||
|-
|Viscount Strangford (1628)||Philip Smythe, 2nd Viscount Strangford||1635||1708||
|-
|rowspan=2|Viscount Scudamore (1628)||John Scudamore, 2nd Viscount Scudamore||1671||1697||Died
|-
|James Scudamore, 3rd Viscount Scudamore||1697||1716||
|-
|rowspan=2|Viscount Wenman (1628)||Richard Wenman, 4th Viscount Wenman||1686||1690||Died
|-
|Richard Wenman, 5th Viscount Wenman||1690||1728||
|-
|Viscount FitzWilliam (1629)||Thomas FitzWilliam, 4th Viscount FitzWilliam||1670||1704||
|-
|Viscount Fairfax of Emley (1629)||Charles Fairfax, 5th Viscount Fairfax of Emley||1651||1711||
|-
|Viscount Ikerrin (1629)||Pierce Butler, 4th Viscount Ikerrin||1688||1711||
|-
|Viscount Clanmalier (1631)||Maximilian O'Dempsey, 3rd Viscount Clanmalier||1683||1691||Attainted, peerage forfeited
|-
|Viscount Cullen (1642)||Charles Cokayne, 4th Viscount Cullen||1687||1716||
|-
|Viscount Carrington (1643)||Francis Smith, 2nd Viscount Carrington||1665||1701||
|-
|Viscount Tracy (1643)||William Tracy, 4th Viscount Tracy||1687||1712||
|-
|Viscount Bulkeley (1644)||Richard Bulkeley, 3rd Viscount Bulkeley||1688||1704||
|-
|Viscount Barnewall (1646)||Nicholas Barnewall, 3rd Viscount Barnewall||1688||1725||
|-
|Viscount Galmoye (1646)||Piers Butler, 3rd Viscount of Galmoye||1667||1697||Attainted, peerage forfeited
|-
|rowspan=2|Viscount Massereene (1660)||John Skeffington, 2nd Viscount Massereene||1665||1695||Died
|-
|Clotworthy Skeffington, 3rd Viscount Massereene||1695||1714||
|-
|rowspan=2|Viscount Shannon (1660)||Francis Boyle, 1st Viscount Shannon||1660||1699||Died
|-
|Richard Boyle, 2nd Viscount Shannon||1699||1740||
|-
|Viscount Fanshawe (1661)||Charles Fanshawe, 4th Viscount Fanshawe||1687||1710||
|-
|Viscount Cholmondeley (1661)||Hugh Cholmondeley, 2nd Viscount Cholmondeley||1681||1725||
|-
|rowspan=2|Viscount Dungannon (1662)||Lewis Trevor, 2nd Viscount Dungannon||1670||1693||Died
|-
|Marcus Trevor, 3rd Viscount Dungannon||1693||1706||
|-
|Viscount Clare (1662)||Daniel O'Brien, 3rd Viscount Clare||1670||1691||Attainted
|-
|rowspan=2|Viscount Fitzhardinge (1663)||Maurice Berkeley, 3rd Viscount Fitzhardinge||1668||1690||Died
|-
|John Berkeley, 4th Viscount Fitzhardinge||1690||1712||
|-
|Viscount Charlemont (1665)||William Caulfeild, 2nd Viscount Charlemont||1671||1726||
|-
|Viscount Powerscourt (1665)||Folliott Wingfield, 1st Viscount Powerscourt||1665||1717||
|-
|Viscount Blesington (1673)||Murrough Boyle, 1st Viscount Blesington||1673||1718||
|-
|Viscount Lanesborough (1676)||James Lane, 2nd Viscount Lanesborough||1683||1724||
|-
|rowspan=2|Viscount Downe (1680)||John Dawnay, 1st Viscount Downe||1680||1695||Died
|-
|Henry Dawnay, 2nd Viscount Downe||1695||1741||
|-
|Viscount Rosse (1681)||Richard Parsons, 1st Viscount Rosse||1681||1703||
|-
|rowspan=2|Viscount Mountjoy (1683)||William Stewart, 1st Viscount Mountjoy||1683||1692||Died
|-
|William Stewart, 2nd Viscount Mountjoy||1692||1728||
|-
|Viscount Lisburne (1685)||Adam Loftus, 1st Viscount Lisburne||1685||1691||Died, title extinct
|-
|Viscount Galway (1687)||Ulick Bourke, 1st Viscount Galway||1687||1691||Died, title extinct
|-
|Viscount Lisburne (1695)||John Vaughan, 1st Viscount Lisburne||1695||1721||New creation
|-
|Viscount Windsor (1699)||Thomas Windsor, 1st Viscount Windsor||1699||1738||New creation
|-
|Baron Athenry (1172)||Edward Bermingham, 13th Baron Athenry||1677||1709||
|-
|Baron Kingsale (1223)||Almericus de Courcy, 23rd Baron Kingsale||1669||1720||
|-
|rowspan=2|Baron Kerry (1223)||William Fitzmaurice, 20th Baron Kerry||1661||1697||Died
|-
|Thomas Fitzmaurice, 21st Baron Kerry||1697||1741||
|-
|Baron Slane (1370)||Christopher Fleming, 17th Baron Slane||1676||1691||Attainted, peerage forfeited 
|-
|Baron Howth (1425)||Thomas St Lawrence, 13th Baron Howth||1671||1727||
|-
|rowspan=2|Baron Trimlestown (1461)||Matthias Barnewall, 10th Baron Trimlestown||1689||1692||Died
|-
|John Barnewall, 11th Baron Trimlestown||1692||1746||
|-
|rowspan=2|Baron Dunsany (1462)||Christopher Plunkett, 10th Baron of Dunsany||1668||1690||Died
|-
|Randall Plunkett, 11th Baron of Dunsany||1690||1735||
|-
|rowspan=2|Baron Dunboyne (1541)||Pierce Butler, 5th/15th Baron Dunboyne||1662||1690||Died
|-
|James Butler, 6th/16th Baron Dunboyne||1690||1701||
|-
|Baron Upper Ossory (1541)||Barnaby Fitzpatrick, 7th Baron Upper Ossory||1666||1691||Attainted, peerage forfeited 
|-
|Baron Bourke of Castleconnell (1580)||William Bourke, 8th Baron Bourke of Connell||1680||1691||Attainted, peerage forfeited 
|-
|Baron Cahir (1583)||Theobald Butler, 5th Baron Cahir||1676||1700||
|-
|rowspan=2|Baron Hamilton (1617)||Claud Hamilton, 5th Baron Hamilton of Strabane||1668||1691||Attainted
|-
|Charles Hamilton, 6th Baron Hamilton of Strabane||1691||1701||Restored
|-
|Baron Bourke of Brittas (1618)||Theobald Bourke, 3rd Baron Bourke of Brittas||1668||1691||Attainted, title forfeited
|-
|rowspan=2|Baron Folliot (1620)||Thomas Folliott, 2nd Baron Folliott||1622||1697||Died
|-
|Henry Folliott, 3rd Baron Folliott||1697||1716||
|-
|rowspan=2|Baron Maynard (1620)||William Maynard, 2nd Baron Maynard||1640||1699||Died
|-
|Banastre Maynard, 3rd Baron Maynard||1699||1718||
|-
|Baron Gorges of Dundalk (1620)||Richard Gorges, 2nd Baron Gorges of Dundalk||1650||1712||
|-
|Baron Digby (1620)||William Digby, 5th Baron Digby||1685||1752||
|-
|Baron Fitzwilliam (1620)||William Fitzwilliam, 3rd Baron Fitzwilliam||1658||1719||
|-
|Baron Blayney (1621)||William Blayney, 6th Baron Blayney||1689||1705||
|-
|Baron Brereton (1624)||John Brereton, 4th Baron Brereton||1680||1718||
|-
|Baron Herbert of Castle Island (1624)||Henry Herbert, 4th Baron Herbert of Castle Island||1678||1691||Died, title extinct
|-
|Baron Baltimore (1625)||Charles Calvert, 3rd Baron Baltimore||1675||1715||
|-
|Baron Coleraine (1625)||Henry Hare, 2nd Baron Coleraine||1667||1708||
|-
|Baron Sherard (1627)||Bennet Sherard, 2nd Baron Sherard||1640||1700||
|-
|rowspan=2|Baron Alington (1642)||Giles Alington, 4th Baron Alington||1685||1691||Died
|-
|Hildebrand Alington, 5th Baron Alington||1691||1723||
|-
|Baron Hawley (1646)||Francis Hawley, 2nd Baron Hawley||1684||1743||
|-
|rowspan=2|Baron Kingston (1660)||Robert King, 2nd Baron Kingston||1676||1693||Died
|-
|John King, 3rd Baron Kingston||1693||1728||
|-
|rowspan=2|Baron Barry of Santry (1661)||Richard Barry, 2nd Baron Barry of Santry||1673||1694||Died
|-
|Henry Barry, 3rd Baron Barry of Santry||1694||1734||
|-
|rowspan=2|Baron Altham (1681)||Altham Annesley, 1st Baron Altham||1681||1699||Died
|-
|James George Annesley, 2nd Baron Altham||1699||1700||
|-
|rowspan=3|Baron Bellew of Duleek (1686)||John Bellew, 1st Baron Bellew of Duleek||1686||1693||Died
|-
|Walter Bellew, 2nd Baron Bellew of Duleek||1693||1694||Died
|-
|Richard Bellew, 3rd Baron Bellew of Duleek||1694||1715||
|-
|Baron Shelburne (1688)||Elizabeth Petty, Baroness Shelburne||1688||1708||
|-
|Baron Shelburne (1688)||Charles Petty, 1st Baron Shelburne||1688||1696||Died, title extinct
|-
|Baron Cutts of Gowran (1690)||John Cutts, 1st Baron Cutts||1690||1707||New creation
|-
|Baron Coningsby (1692)||Thomas Coningsby, 1st Baron Coningsby||1692||1729||New creation
|-
|Baron Shelburne (1699)||Henry Petty, 1st Baron Shelburne||1699||1751||New creation
|-
|}

References

 

1690
1690s in England
1690s in Ireland
1690s in Scotland
Peers
Peers
1690
Peers
Peers
Peers